Thomas Worrall (Tom) Kent,  (April 3, 1922 – November 15, 2011) was a Canadian economist, journalist, editor, public servant, and industrialist.

Born in Stafford, England, Kent graduated from Corpus Christi College, Oxford, and worked as a journalist for The Manchester Guardian and The Economist. In 1954 he immigrated to Canada to become editor of the Winnipeg Free Press. He later served as a key advisor to Prime Minister Lester Pearson, and was the architect of the federal Liberal revival of the 1960s. He was a leading thinker behind the socio-economic strategies of the 1970s, and served as deputy minister of immigration in the government of Lester Pearson. Kent served as president of the Cape Breton Development Corporation, and later of the Sydney Steel Corp. In 1980 he was appointed to chair the Royal Commission on Newspapers, which would become known as the Kent Commission.

In 1979, he was made an Officer of the Order of Canada and was promoted to Companion in 2001.

In 1963, Kent stood for election in the British Columbia riding of Burnaby—Coquitlam, but was defeated by Tommy Douglas.

In his later years, Kent was a Fellow with Queen's University's School of Policy Studies.

References

External links
 Thomas Worrall Kent at The Canadian Encyclopedia

1922 births
2011 deaths
Canadian economists
Canadian male journalists
Companions of the Order of Canada
Journalists from Ontario
Candidates in the 1963 Canadian federal election
Alumni of Corpus Christi College, Oxford
British emigrants to Canada
People from Stafford
Academic staff of the Queen's University at Kingston
Liberal Party of Canada candidates for the Canadian House of Commons